The Vanguard-Sentinel Career and Technology Centers are joint vocational schools located in Fremont, Ohio and Tiffin, Ohio.  Vanguard Tech Center is located in Fremont, adjacent to Fremont Ross High School, while Sentinel Career and Technology Center is located south of Tiffin.  

VSCTC serves school districts primarily located in Ottawa, Sandusky, Seneca, Wood, and Wyandot counties, with parts of Crawford, Hancock, Huron, and Marion counties also served.  A variety of programs are offered to 16 area high school juniors and seniors, which are split between the two locations.

Schools served
source  

Clyde High School
Fremont Ross High School
Fostoria High School
Gibsonburg High School
Hopewell-Loudon High School
Lakota High School
Mohawk High School
New Riegel High School
Old Fort High School
Port Clinton High School
St. Joseph Central Catholic High School
Seneca East High School
Tiffin Calvert High School
Tiffin Columbian High School
Upper Sandusky High School

Notes

Vocational schools in Ohio